The 1950 Tipperary Senior Hurling Championship was the 60th staging of the Tipperary Senior Hurling Championship since its establishment by the Tipperary County Board in 1887. The championship began on 1 October 1950 and ended 26 November 1950.

Borris-Ileigh were the defending champions.

On 26 November 1950, Borris-Ileigh won the championship after a 2-07 to 2-03 defeat of Carrick Davins in the final at Thurles Sportsfield. It was their second championship title overall and their second title in succession.

Qualification

Results

Semi-finals

Final

References

Tipperary
Tipperary Senior Hurling Championship